The 2018 season was Kuala Lumpur's 40th season in competitive season and the 1st season in Malaysia Super League since being promoted after winning the 2017 Malaysia Premier League.

Players

First team squad

Transfers

1st leg

In:

Out:

2nd leg

In:

Competitions

Malaysia Super League

Malaysia FA Cup

Malaysia Cup

Squad appearances statistics

Squad goals statistics

Clean sheets

References

External links

2018
Malaysian football clubs 2018 season